This is a list of cases reported in volume 94 of United States Reports, decided by the Supreme Court of the United States in 1876 and 1877.

Justices of the Supreme Court at the time of 94 U.S. 

The Supreme Court is established by Article III, Section 1 of the Constitution of the United States, which says: "The judicial Power of the United States, shall be vested in one supreme Court . . .". The size of the Court is not specified; the Constitution leaves it to Congress to set the number of justices. Under the Judiciary Act of 1789 Congress originally fixed the number of justices at six (one chief justice and five associate justices). Since 1789 Congress has varied the size of the Court from six to seven, nine, ten, and back to nine justices (always including one chief justice).

When the cases in 94 U.S. were decided the Court comprised the following nine members:

Notable Case in 94 U.S.

Munn v. Illinois
In Munn v. Illinois,    94 U.S. 113 (1876), the Supreme Court upheld the power of state governments to regulate private industries that affect "the common good".  The case resulted because in 1871 the Illinois legislature responded to pressure from the National Grange, an association of farmers, by setting maximum rates that private companies could charge for the storage and transport of agricultural products. The Chicago grain warehouse firm of Munn and Scott was found guilty of violating the law but appealed the conviction on the grounds that the law was an unconstitutional deprivation of property without due process of law that violated the Fourteenth Amendment. The Supreme Court of Illinois ruled in favor of the State, and the US Supreme Court upheld its judgment. In his opinion for the Court, Chief Justice Morrison Waite affirmed the constitutionality of state regulation extending to private industries that affect public interests, also stating that even though Congress alone is granted control over interstate commerce, a state could take action in the public interest without impairing that federal control.  Significantly, this ruling also applied to railroads, as railroad companies were deemed private companies serving the public interest.  Munn v. Illinois was a landmark precedent that state regulation of grain elevator rates and railroad rates was within the bounds of the Constitution.

Citation style 

Under the Judiciary Act of 1789 the federal court structure at the time comprised District Courts, which had general trial jurisdiction; Circuit Courts, which had mixed trial and appellate (from the US District Courts) jurisdiction; and the United States Supreme Court, which had appellate jurisdiction over the federal District and Circuit courts—and for certain issues over state courts. The Supreme Court also had limited original jurisdiction (i.e., in which cases could be filed directly with the Supreme Court without first having been heard by a lower federal or state court). There were one or more federal District Courts and/or Circuit Courts in each state, territory, or other geographical region.

Bluebook citation style is used for case names, citations, and jurisdictions.  
 e.g.,"C.C.D.N.J." = United States Circuit Court for the District of New Jersey
 e.g.,"D. Mass." = United States District Court for the District of Massachusetts 
 "E." = Eastern; "M." = Middle; "N." = Northern; "S." = Southern; "W." = Western
 e.g.,"C.C.S.D.N.Y." = United States Circuit Court for the Southern District of New York
 e.g.,"M.D. Ala." = United States District Court for the Middle District of Alabama
 "Ct. Cl." = United States Court of Claims
 The abbreviation of a state's name alone indicates the highest appellate court in that state's judiciary at the time. 
 e.g.,"Pa." = Supreme Court of Pennsylvania
 e.g.,"Me." = Supreme Judicial Court of Maine

List of cases in 94 U.S.

Notes and references

External links
  Case reports in volume 94 from Library of Congress
  Case reports in volume 94 from Court Listener
  Case reports in volume 94 from the Caselaw Access Project of Harvard Law School
  Case reports in volume 94 from Google Scholar
  Case reports in volume 94 from Justia
  Case reports in volume 94 from Open Jurist
 Website of the United States Supreme Court
 United States Courts website about the Supreme Court
 National Archives, Records of the Supreme Court of the United States
 American Bar Association, How Does the Supreme Court Work?
 The Supreme Court Historical Society

1876 in United States case law
1877 in United States case law